Tom D’Agostino (born 17 January 1959 in Washington, D.C.) is the group president of Government at Fluor Corporation. D'Agostino has held leadership positions for more than 36 years in the Government sector including the National Nuclear Security Administration (NNSA), NuScale Power, US Naval Reserves, Department of Energy in tritium Production reactors, and the Naval Sea Systems Command.

Thomas Paul D'Agostino has a B.S. in physical science from the U.S. Naval Academy in May 1980; an M.S. in business finance from Johns Hopkins University School of Continuing Studies in May 1995; and an M.A. in national security and strategic studies from the Naval War College in June 1997.

D'Agostino served over eight years on active duty in the Navy as a submarine officer, including time at sea aboard . Transitioning to the Naval Reserve, he was selected for promotion to captain on 1 April 2001. Confirmed by the Senate on 27 July 2001, his promotion was effective on 1 November 2001.

D'Agostino has received the President Rank Meritorious Executive Award, the Meritorious Unit Commendation, the Navy Achievement Medal, the National Defense Service Medal, the James R. Schlesinger Award, the Navy Expeditionary Medal, and the Arms control Person of the Year award.

References 

1959 births
Living people
People from Washington, D.C.
United States Naval Academy alumni
United States Department of Energy officials
Johns Hopkins University alumni
Naval War College alumni
United States Navy captains
American energy industry executives